The 2004 Men's Pacific Handball Cup was held in Sydney, Australia between 7 and 13 June 2004. It was simultaneously hold with the 2004 Oceania Handball Championship.

The competition participants host Australia, New Zealand, Tahiti, Cook Islands and New Caledonia.

Hosts Australia were the winners and undefeated all tournament. New Caledonia in the final were runners up followed by Tahiti, New Zealand and Cook Islands.

Results

Group A

Group B

Third place game

Final

Rankings

Friendly matches

References

Official website (archived)
 Archive on Tudor 66
 Les Sport Info Archive (French)

Pacific Handball Cup
Pacific Handball Cup
2004 Pacific Handball Cup
2004 in Australian sport